The Canadian Northern Ontario Railway Bridge is a railway plate girder bridge over the Rideau River from the Merivale area to the Mooney's Bay neighbourhood in Ottawa, Ontario, Canada. It is owned today by the CNoR's successor Canadian National Railway, and amongst other services carries the Via Rail Toronto – Ottawa Corridor passenger trains.

The official designation of the bridge is Mile 5.8, subdivision Beachburg.

History
The bridge is on the CN Beachburg Subdivision, was authorized by BRC order 13668 on 18 May 1911, and the plans were approved by order 14828 on 20 September 1911. It was inaugurated with the opening of the line from Hurdman Junction (between today's Hurdman Station (OC Transpo) and Ottawa Train Station) to Smiths Falls on 3 December 1913.

References

Bridges completed in 1913
Railway bridges in Ontario
Canadian National Railway bridges in Ontario
1913 establishments in Ontario